General elections were held in Singapore on Friday, 11 September 2015 to elect 89 members of Parliament. The outgoing Parliament had been dissolved and the general election called by President Tony Tan on 25 August, on the advice of Prime Minister Lee Hsien Loong. The elections were for the 13th Parliament since independence in 1965, using the first-past-the-post electoral system.

The elections were the first since independence in which all seats were contested. Most of the seats were contested between two parties, with the only three-cornered fights occurring in three Single Member Constituencies. The elections were also the first after the March 2015 death of Lee Kuan Yew (the nation's first prime minister and an MP until his death) and Singapore's 50th anniversary celebration on 9 August that year.

Out of 89 seats, the People's Action Party (PAP) contested all and won 83, with the other 6 seats won by The Workers' Party of Singapore (WP); WP successfully retained their wards of Aljunied GRC and Hougang SMC but the single seat from Punggol East SMC was the only seat to change hands, recaptured by PAP. Voter turnout was 93.56%, discounting overseas votes. PAP won its best results since 2001 with 69.86% of the popular vote, an increase of 9.72% from the previous election in 2011. WP scored 39.75% of votes in the 28 seats it contested, a drop of 6.83%. In the overall popular vote, WP scored 12.48% and the remaining seven parties less than 4% each. Three candidates failed to secure at least 12.5% of votes in their area and thus lost their electoral deposit.

Background
The maximum term of a Singaporean parliament is five years, within which it must be dissolved by the President and elections held within three months, as stated in the Constitution. As like the previous elections since 1959, voting is compulsory and results are based on the first-past-the-post system. Elections are conducted by the Elections Department, which is under the jurisdiction of the Prime Minister's Office.

The General Election was the 17th General Election in Singapore and is the 12th since independence in 1965. The election coincides with the golden jubilee of the Republic of Singapore's founding.

The governing People's Action Party (PAP) have secured their 14th consecutive term in office since 1959. This will be the PAP's third election with Lee Hsien Loong as its Secretary-General, and the country's first election after the passing of its founding Prime Minister Lee Kuan Yew. Some analysts suggested that an early election was indeed possible to garner "sympathy votes" might well backfire. It is also the country's first election where there are no walkovers in any of the constituencies, as voting will take place in Tanjong Pagar GRC for the first time.

Political parties

The governing People's Action Party (PAP) has been in power since 1959 and is currently led by the Prime Minister Lee Hsien Loong. The leading Opposition party is The Worker's Party, led by Low Thia Khiang, with 7 elected seats and 2 NCMP seats. The Singapore People's Party led by Chiam See Tong has 1 NCMP seat. A total of eight Opposition parties challenged the ruling party in this election.

Electoral divisions

The Electoral Boundaries Review Committee is convened before every general election to review electoral boundaries in view of population growth and shifts. The committee is appointed by the prime minister. The new electoral divisions were published on 24 July 2015, indicating the beginning of an election cycle.

Singapore's largest newspaper, The Straits Times, created an interactive map of the boundary changes. Click here to explore the interactive.

Changes in Group Representation Constituencies

Timeline

Pre-nomination day events

Nomination centres
The Elections Department issued the following information upon the issuance of the writ of election
 Date: 1 September 2015
 Time: 11:00 p.m. to 12.00 p.m.
 Returning Officer: Ng Wai Choong
 Election Deposit: S$14,500 (down from S$16,000 in 2011)

Nomination day and campaigning events

Campaigning began from 1 September and ended on 9 September to canvass votes through physical rallies and stream on various media platforms. A live debate was held on 1 September in English and Chinese channel platforms, followed by two party political broadcasts airing on 3 and 10 September. The eve of polling day, known as cooling-off day, prohibits party from campaigning except for party political broadcasts.

Outgoing incumbents and incoming candidates

A total of 72 candidates made their political debut this election, among which the PAP team include a former Second Permanent Secretary, a former MediaCorp television personality, a former police assistant commissioner, a founder of an organisation focusing animal welfare, and a former Chief of Defence Force. 14 MPs from the 12th Parliament stepped down this election, and one MP died during the term in office on 23 March this year, which is former Minister Mentor and first Prime Minister of Singapore Lee Kuan Yew, who served the Tanjong Pagar division for a record 60 years, the longest tenure for any elected MPs.

Results

After polls closed at 8pm, vote counting began. Results were announced by Ng Wai Choong, chief executive director of the Energy Market Authority, who acted as the Returning Officer for the election. The first result was declared at 11.31pm on 11 September where PAP candidate Lam Pin Min won the Sengkang West Single Member Constituency with a majority of 17,564. The last result was declared at 3.10am on 12 September where Workers' Party team contesting Aljunied Group Representation Constituency, led by party's secretary-general Low Thia Khiang, won the constituency by a narrow margin of 1.9%/6.84°, or a majority of 2,612.

Contrary to expectations of a tougher contest with all constituencies being contested by the opposition parties, PAP won its best ever results since the 2001 general election, achieving a swing of 9.7% to achieve 69.9% of the vote as compared to the previous election in 2011 when it received 60.1%. The PAP unexpectedly reclaimed the constituency of Punggol East after it was lost to WP in a 2013 by-election, and achieved a swing in Aljunied GRC large enough to force a vote recount although the WP retained the constituency. With six elected seats for WP, three seats for the Non-Constituency Member of Parliament were eligible to complete a minimum of nine opposition members; WP was qualified for all three seats by-virtue of being the top three losing performers for the election (the single member constituencies of Punggol East (later declined) and Fengshan, and one seat (later two) for the East Coast Group Representation Constituency), and thus WP had nine represented seats for the upcoming Parliament.

The victory for the Potong Pasir Single Member Constituency has post its widest swing among all other Single Member Constituencies for this election, with 16.05%, while the largest swing for all contested constituencies was Bishan–Toa Payoh Group Representation Constituency, with 16.66%. This victory resulted in the end of a 31-year reign of Singapore People's Party as they failed to win at least a seat in Parliament (including NCMPs) for the first time, despite Potong Pasir was SPP's best performing constituency for the election. Consequently, this was also the first time since 1986 only one opposition party (Singapore Democratic Party, at the time) represented the Parliament, and after the 1981's Anson's by-election where WP being the only opposition party to represent the Parliament alone, as none of the other seven opposition parties, including SPP and two independents, won contests.

A poll held by the Institute of Policy Studies among 2,000 voters noted that 79 percent believed "The whole election system is fair to all political parties." up from 61 per cent in 2011

Voter turnout for the election was 93.56%/336.8°, with 2,304,331 votes cast.

By constituency
In an election's first, sample counts were released by the Elections Department to prevent speculation and misinformation from unofficial sources while counting is underway. All sample counts were released by 10PM – two hours after polling ended. With the exception of Aljunied and Punggol East, where counts were within a 4% error margin, all other figures showed that PAP had comfortable leads in 26 electoral divisions, while WP led in one electoral division.

Analysis

Top 14 best PAP performers
 Constituencies with no comparison to 2011 were either due to them being new constituencies or the constituencies experiencing walkovers in the last election.

Top 15 best opposition performers
 Constituencies with no comparison to 2011 were either due to them being new constituencies or the constituencies experiencing walkovers in the last election.

Vote Swings
 Only the following constituencies may be compared with 2011 results as they existed in both elections, although most had changes in their electoral boundaries.

Sample count accuracies

See also
 Elections in Singapore
 2016 Bukit Batok by-election - the only by-election held within a year after the election as a result of the sudden resignation of David Ong Kim Huat

Notes

References

External links

 Battleground Singapore: Who's standing where - an interactive map of the 2015 boundaries and changes explained in maps.
 From Nomination Day to Polling Day: Election calendar and rally schedule - an interactive calendar of all the key events and rally schedules for the #GE2015 campaign period from Nomination Day to Polling Day. It also serves as an archive of key photos from each rally and the related ST article.
 Who will be your next MP? - the complete list of all 181 candidates. Includes personal information, their latest tweet, results from previous elections or a Q&A if they are a new candidate.
 GE2015 Candidates - an interactive visualisation of the election candidates showing parties, wards, and diversity representation.
 SG Elections - Interactive maps showing data for differences in vote shares, non-voters, spoiled votes, districts by candidates, etc.
 #GE2015 Social media dashboard - this is a visual representation of the social media trends that fluctuate over the 10-day period of campaigning. There are two graphs updated in real-time, a selected feature of popular tweets and the last 80 Instagram pictures tagged #GE2015.
 GE2015: Live results and full analysis

Singapore
2015 in Singapore
 
General elections in Singapore